Falagriini is a tribe of rove beetles in the family Staphylinidae. There are about 11 genera and at least 20 described species in Falagriini.

Genera
These 11 genera belong to the tribe Falagriini:
 Aleodorus Say, 1830 i c g b
 Borboropora Kraatz, 1862 i c g
 Bryobiota Casey, 1893 i c g
 Cordalia Jacobs, 1925 i c g b
 Falagria Leach, 1819 i c g b
 Falagrioma Casey, 1906 i c g
 Falagriota Casey, 1906 i c g
 Leptagria Casey, 1906 i c g
 Lissagria Casey, 1906 i c g b
 Myrmecocephalus MacLeay, 1873 i c g b
 Myrmecopora Saulcy, 1864 i c g
Data sources: i = ITIS, c = Catalogue of Life, g = GBIF, b = Bugguide.net

References

Further reading

External links

 

Aleocharinae
Articles created by Qbugbot